Wade House can refer to:

Wade House (Ipswich, Massachusetts)
Jonathan Wade House, Medford, Massachusetts
William Lincoln Wade House, Salem, Oregon, listed on the National Register of Historic Places (NRHP)
Dwight and Kate Wade House, Sevierville, Tennessee, listed on the NRHP
Alexander Wade House, Morgantown, West Virginia
Wade House Historic Site, Greenbush, Wisconsin
Sylvanus Wade House the core building of the site